Ojārs Grīnbergs (19 November 1942 – 22 April 2016) was a Soviet and Latvian singer.

Biography 
Ojārs Grīnbergs was born on 19 November 1942 in Riga.

Since 1961, he was a soloist with various ensembles in Riga. During his military service in the Soviet Army, he was the founder and lead singer of vocal and instrumental ensemble Zvyozdochka, which became the winner of competition of "Liepaja Amber". He was a member of the Riga variety orchestra (1966-1974).

Since 1973, he sang in a duet with Margarita Vilcāne, both performers were soloists pop ensemble Latvian State Philharmonic, who bore the title of 1979 Tip Top.

He took part in the recording of the Raimonds Pauls studio albums Tev, mana labā  (1969) and  Tik dzintars vien  (1970). He was the winner of the International Competition Rostock-72 Pop Song (1972).

He was a member of the party Tautas kustība Latvijai (1995-1996), deputy Saeima  (1995—1998).

He was a Chevalier of the Order of the Three Stars.

Death
Ojārs Grīnbergs died in Riga on 22 April 2016 of lung cancer, aged 73.

References

External links
Личные данные на портале Сейма
   Ojārs Grīnbergs BRG mājas lapā

1942 births
2016 deaths
Musicians from Riga
People's Movement for Latvia politicians
Deputies of the 6th Saeima
20th-century Latvian male singers
Soviet male singers
Politicians from Riga